Narcastet is a commune in the Pyrénées-Atlantiques department in south-western France.

See also
Communes of the Pyrénées-Atlantiques department

References

Communes of Pyrénées-Atlantiques